Feliciano Muñoz Rivilla (21 August 1936 – 6 November 2017) was a Spanish footballer who played as a right back.

He spent the better part of his 16-year senior career with Atlético Madrid, playing 356 competitive games and scoring seven goals. He won four major honours with that club, including the 1965–66 edition of La Liga.

A Spain international in the 60s, Rivilla represented the nation in two World Cups and the 1964 European Championship, conquering the latter tournament.

Club career
Born in Ávila, Castile and León, Rivilla started playing football with local Real Ávila CF, moving to Real Murcia from Segunda División at the age of 17. At the end of the season with signed with La Liga club Atlético Madrid, who them loaned him for three years to Plus Ultra and Rayo Vallecano, with both teams hailing from the Community of Madrid and competing in the second tier and where he featured mostly as a winger.

Rivilla played his first top-flight match with Atlético on 21 September 1958, in a 2–4 away loss against Valencia CF. He scored his first league goal the following 1 February, in a 3–3 away draw with Sevilla FC.

Already reconverted to a right back, Rivilla was an undisputed starter for the Colchoneros in the following years, notably winning two Copa del Generalísimo trophies and the 1966 national championship, contributing one goal from 24 appearances to the latter conquest. Additionally, he featured in nine games in the team's victorious campaign in the UEFA Cup Winners' Cup of 1961–62.

After having Pelé and Santos FC appear at his testimonial match in September 1969, one year after retiring at 32, Rivilla went on to work in home appliance and act as president of Atlético's veterans association.

International career
Rivilla won 26 caps for the Spain national team over five years, his debut coming on 10 July 1960 in a 3–1 away friendly win against Peru. He only played once in the 1962 FIFA World Cup due to a foot fracture, but was the starter when the country won the 1964 European Nations' Cup held on home soil.

Rivilla was again selected to the 1966 World Cup, being an unused squad member in England. He also took part in the under-21 side's first-ever game, against Italy in 1959.

Death and personal life
Rivilla died on 6 November 2017 at the age of 81, in Madrid.

His grandson, Álvaro Muñoz, played professional basketball.

Honours
Atlético Madrid
La Liga: 1965–66
Copa del Generalísimo: 1959–60, 1960–61, 1964–65
UEFA Cup Winners' Cup: 1961–62

Spain
UEFA European Championship: 1964

Individual
UEFA European Championship Team of the Tournament: 1964

References

External links

 
 
 
 

1936 births
2017 deaths
People from Ávila, Spain
Sportspeople from the Province of Ávila
Spanish footballers
Footballers from Castile and León
Association football defenders
Association football wingers
La Liga players
Segunda División players
Real Murcia players
Atlético Madrid footballers
Real Madrid Castilla footballers
Rayo Vallecano players
Spain under-21 international footballers
Spain international footballers
1962 FIFA World Cup players
1964 European Nations' Cup players
UEFA European Championship-winning players
1966 FIFA World Cup players